Armando Valles (born 6 May 1941) is a Mexican gymnast. He competed at the 1960 Summer Olympics and the 1968 Summer Olympics.

References

1941 births
Living people
Mexican male artistic gymnasts
Olympic gymnasts of Mexico
Gymnasts at the 1960 Summer Olympics
Gymnasts at the 1968 Summer Olympics
Sportspeople from Mexico City
Pan American Games medalists in gymnastics
Pan American Games bronze medalists for Mexico
Gymnasts at the 1967 Pan American Games
Medalists at the 1967 Pan American Games
20th-century Mexican people